Alex Almeida Martins (born ) is a Brazilian former futsal player who played as a winger and pivot. Throughout his career Alex won three Belgian league titles and the 2004–05 UEFA Futsal Cup with Belgian side Action 21 and four Portuguese league titles with Sporting CP. He also scored a total of 40 goals in the UEFA Futsal Cup, making him one of the most prolific goalscorers in the continent's top competition.

Honours
Action 21
Belgian Division 1 (3): 2002–03, 2004–05, 2005–06
UEFA Futsal Cup: 2004–05

Sporting CP
Liga Portuguesa (4): 2009–10, 2010–11, 2012–13, 2013–14
Taça de Portugal (3): 2007–08, 2010–11, 2012–13
Supertaça de Portugal (4): 2008, 2010, 2013, 2014
Taça de Honra AF Lisboa: 2013

References

External links
FPF club profile
Liga Nacional Fútbol Sala profile
The Final Ball profile

1980 births
Living people
Sportspeople from Minas Gerais
Brazilian men's futsal players
Sporting CP futsal players